The DFB-Pokal 2007–08 was the 28th season of the cup competition, Germany's second-most important title in women's football. The first round of the tournament was held on 1–2 September 2007. In the final which was held in Berlin on 19 April 2008 FFC Frankfurt defeated FC Saarbrücken 5–1, thus claiming their seventh title.

First round

Second round

Third round

Quarter-finals

Semi-finals

Final

DFB-Pokal Frauen seasons
Pokal
Fra